Coralliophila basileus is a species of sea snail, a marine gastropod mollusk in the family Muricidae, the murex snails or rock snails.

Description
The length of the shell attains 23.2 mm.

Distribution
This marine species was found in the Bay of Biscay.

References

 Gofas, S.; Le Renard, J.; Bouchet, P. (2001). Mollusca. in: Costello, M.J. et al. (eds), European Register of Marine Species: a check-list of the marine species in Europe and a bibliography of guides to their identification. Patrimoines Naturels. 50: 180-213
 Oliverio M. & Gofas S. (2006). Coralliophiline diversity at mid-Atlantic seamounts (Neogastropoda, Muricidae, Coralliophilinae). Bulletin of Marine Science 79(1): 205-230

External links
 Dautzenberg P. & Fischer H. (1896). Dragages effectués par l'Hirondelle et par la Princesse Alice 1888-1895. 1. Mollusques Gastéropodes. Mémoires de la Société Zoologique de France. 9: 395-498, pl. 15-22
 Locard, A., 1897 Mollusques testacés. In: Expéditions scientifiques du Travailleur et du Talisman pendant les années 1880, 1881, 1882, 1883, vol. 1, p. 516 p, 22 pls
 Gofas, S.; Luque, Á. A.; Templado, J.; Salas, C. (2017). A national checklist of marine Mollusca in Spanish waters. Scientia Marina. 81(2) : 241-254, and supplementary online material
 Bouchet, P.; Warén, A. (1985). Revision of the Northeast Atlantic bathyal and abyssal Neogastropoda excluding Turridae (Mollusca, Gastropoda). Bollettino Malacologico. supplement 1: 121-296.

Gastropods described in 1896
Coralliophila